Elections in the Republic of India in 1994 included elections to four state legislative assemblies and to seats in the Rajya Sabha.

Legislative Assembly elections

Andhra Pradesh

Goa

Karnataka

|-
! style="background-color:#E9E9E9;text-align:left;" |Parties
! style="background-color:#E9E9E9;text-align:right;" |Flag
! style="background-color:#E9E9E9;text-align:right;" |Seats contested
! style="background-color:#E9E9E9;text-align:right;" |Seats won
! style="background-color:#E9E9E9;text-align:right;" |% of votes
!  style="background-color:#E9E9E9" |Seat change
!style="background-color:#E9E9E9" |Vote share % change
|-
| style="text-align:left;" |Janata Dal
| style="text-align:right;vertical-align:top;" |
| style="text-align:right;vertical-align:top;" |221
| style="text-align:right;vertical-align:top;" |115
| style="text-align:right;vertical-align:top;" |33.54%
| style="text-align:right;vertical-align:top;" |77
| style="text-align:right;vertical-align:top;" |6.46%
|-
| style="text-align:left;" |Bharatiya Janata Party (BJP)
| style="text-align:right;vertical-align:top;" |
| style="text-align:right;vertical-align:top;" |223
| style="text-align:right;vertical-align:top;" |40
| style="text-align:right;vertical-align:top;" |16.99%
| style="text-align:right;vertical-align:top;" |36
| style="text-align:right;vertical-align:top;" |12.85%
|-
| style="text-align:left;" |Indian National Congress
| style="text-align:right;vertical-align:top;" |
| style="text-align:right;vertical-align:top;" |221
| style="text-align:right;vertical-align:top;" |34
| style="text-align:right;vertical-align:top;" |26.95%
| style="text-align:right;vertical-align:top;" |143
| style="text-align:right;vertical-align:top;" |16.55%
|-
| style="text-align:left;" |Karnataka Congress Party
| style="text-align:right;vertical-align:top;" |
| style="text-align:right;vertical-align:top;" |218
| style="text-align:right;vertical-align:top;" |10
| style="text-align:right;vertical-align:top;" |7.31%
| style="text-align:right;vertical-align:top;" |New Party
| style="text-align:right;vertical-align:top;" |New Party
|-
| style="text-align:left;" |Karnataka Rajya Raitha Sangha
| style="text-align:right;vertical-align:top;" |
| style="text-align:right;vertical-align:top;" |108
| style="text-align:right;vertical-align:top;" |1
| style="text-align:right;vertical-align:top;" |2.65%
| style="text-align:right;vertical-align:top;" |1
| style="text-align:right;vertical-align:top;" |0.94%
|-
| style="text-align:left;" |Bahujan Samaj Party
| style="text-align:right;vertical-align:top;" |
| style="text-align:right;vertical-align:top;" |77
| style="text-align:right;vertical-align:top;" |1
| style="text-align:right;vertical-align:top;" |0.78%
| style="text-align:right;vertical-align:top;" |1
| style="text-align:right;vertical-align:top;" |0.74
|-
| style="text-align:left;" |Communist Party of India (Marxist)
| style="text-align:right;vertical-align:top;" |
| style="text-align:right;vertical-align:top;" |13
| style="text-align:right;vertical-align:top;" |1
| style="text-align:right;vertical-align:top;" |0.49%
| style="text-align:right;vertical-align:top;" |1
| style="text-align:right;vertical-align:top;" |0.04
|-
| style="text-align:left;" |Indian National League
| style="text-align:right;vertical-align:top;" |
| style="text-align:right;vertical-align:top;" |2
| style="text-align:right;vertical-align:top;" |1
| style="text-align:right;vertical-align:top;" |0.29%
| style="text-align:right;vertical-align:top;" |New Party
| style="text-align:right;vertical-align:top;" |New Party
|-
| style="text-align:left;" |All India Anna Dravida Munnetra Kazhagam
| style="text-align:right;vertical-align:top;" |
| style="text-align:right;vertical-align:top;" |4
| style="text-align:right;vertical-align:top;" |1
| style="text-align:right;vertical-align:top;" |0.24%
| style="text-align:right;vertical-align:top;" |-
| style="text-align:right;vertical-align:top;" |0.06%
|-
| style="text-align:left;" |Kannada Chalavali Vatal Paksha
| style="text-align:right;vertical-align:top;" |
| style="text-align:right;vertical-align:top;" |42
| style="text-align:right;vertical-align:top;" |1
| style="text-align:right;vertical-align:top;" |0.18%
| style="text-align:right;vertical-align:top;" |New Party
| style="text-align:right;vertical-align:top;" |New Party
|-
| style="text-align:left;" |Bharatiya Republican Paksha
| style="text-align:right;vertical-align:top;" |
| style="text-align:right;vertical-align:top;" |2
| style="text-align:right;vertical-align:top;" |1
| style="text-align:right;vertical-align:top;" |0.13%
| style="text-align:right;vertical-align:top;" |1
| style="text-align:right;vertical-align:top;" |0.09%
|-
| style="text-align:left;" |Others
| style="text-align:right;vertical-align:top;" |
| style="text-align:right;vertical-align:top;" |
| style="text-align:right;vertical-align:top;" |0
| style="text-align:right;vertical-align:top;" |1.05%
| style="text-align:right;vertical-align:top;" |3
| style="text-align:right;vertical-align:top;" |2.37%
|-
| style="text-align:left;" |Independent
| style="text-align:right;vertical-align:top;" |
| style="text-align:right;vertical-align:top;" |1256
| style="text-align:right;vertical-align:top;" |17
| style="text-align:right;vertical-align:top;" |9.4%
| style="text-align:right;vertical-align:top;" |5
| style="text-align:right;vertical-align:top;" |1.28%
|-
|style="text-align:left;background-color:#E9E9E9"|Total (Turnout %)
|width="75" style="text-align:right;vertical-align:top;background-color:#E9E9E9"|
|width="30" style="text-align:right;vertical-align:top;background-color:#E9E9E9"|
|width="30" style="text-align:right;vertical-align:top;background-color:#E9E9E9"|224
|width="30" style="text-align:right;vertical-align:top;background-color:#E9E9E9"|100.00
|width="30" style="text-align:right;vertical-align:top;background-color:#E9E9E9"|
|width="30" style="text-align:right;vertical-align:top;background-color:#E9E9E9"|
|-
|}

Sikkim

Rajya Sabha

References

External links
 

1994 elections in India
India
1994 in India
Elections in India by year